Seton may refer to:

People
 Seton (surname), people with the surname Seton
 Seton Airlie (1920—2008), Scottish professional footballer
 Seton Beresford (1868—1928), English first-class cricketer
 Seton Daunt, guitar player and songwriter
 Seton Gordon (1886–1977), Scottish naturalist, photographer, and folklorist
 Seton I. Miller (1902—1974), Hollywood screenwriter and producer
 Seton Pringle (1879–1955), Irish surgeon

Places

Scotland
 Port Seton, a town in East Lothian, Scotland
 Seton Collegiate Church, an ancient monument south east of Cockenzie and Port Seton
 Seton Sands, an area of coastline east of Edinburgh
 Seton Palace, East Lothian, Scotland, rebuilt by Robert Seton, 2nd Earl of Winton

Canada
 Seton, Calgary, a neighbourhood in Calgary, Alberta, Canada
 Seton Lake, British Columbia
 Seton Portage, British Columbia, often referred to simply as "Seton" (which in that form can include nearby Shalalth, British Columbia)
 Seton River, British Columbia, connecting Seton Lake to Cayoosh Creek and the Fraser River at the town of Lillooet
 Seton Dam, a dam on the Seton River
 Seton Canal, a diversion of the flow of the Seton River from Seton Dam
 Seton Portage Historic Provincial Park, Seton Portage, British Columbia
 Seton Powerhouse, a hydroelectric generating station on the Fraser River

United States
 Seton Family of Hospitals, a Roman Catholic-affiliated hospital system in the Central Texas area
 Seton Hall University, a university in South Orange, New Jersey
 Seton High School (disambiguation), any number of high schools with this or a similar name
 Seton Medical Center, a hospital in Daly City, California
 Seton Village, New Mexico

Other
 Seton stitch, used for healing fistulae
 Seton Lake Indian Band, a First Nations band government at Seton Lake, British Columbia
 Patrick "Seton", O'Connor, producer of The Dan Patrick Show
 Seton Company, an automotive leather company
 a trade name for the drug Ondansetron
 Seton Identification Products, a supplier of safety, labeling and signage products

See also
 Seaton (disambiguation)